Baptiste is a French given name or surname, and may be a shortened form of Jean-Baptiste (literally, John the Baptist).

Given name
Baptiste Amar, French ice hockey player
Baptiste Giabiconi (born 1989),  French model and singer
Baptiste Manzini (1920–2008), American football player
Baptiste Martin (born 1985), French football player
Baptiste Pierre Bisson (1767-1811), French military
Baptiste Rollier (born 1982), Swiss orienteer

Surname
Alex Baptiste (born 1986), English football player
Alva Baptiste, a Saint Lucian politician
Bryan Baptiste (1955–2008), American politician
Christian Baptiste (born 1962), French politician from Guadeloupe
Christon Baptiste (born 1980), Trinidadian football player
Cyril Baptiste (1949–2006), American basketball player
Denys Baptiste (born 1969), British jazz musician
Eldine Baptiste (born 1960), West Indian cricket player
Fredrique Eleonore Baptiste (died 1827), Swedish-Finnish playwright
Hailey Baptiste (born 2001), American tennis player
Kelly-Ann Baptiste (born 1986), Trinidad & Tobago female sprinter
Kerry Baptiste (born 1981), Trinidad and Tobago football player
Kirk Baptiste (1962–2022),  American athlete
Nicolas Anselme Baptiste (1761–1835), French actor
Rocky Baptiste (born 1972), English football player
Selwyn Baptiste (1936–2012), Trinidadian-born steelpan musician and educator
Thomas Baptiste (1929–2018), Guyanese-born British actor

Fictional people
Baptiste, full name Jean-Baptiste Augustin, fictional character and 30th hero in the video game Overwatch
Baptiste, fictional character in the video game Assassin's Creed III: Liberation
Baptiste, fictional character in the video game Vainglory
Andre Baptiste, fictional character in the 2005 film Lord of War
Danielle Baptiste, fictional character in the comic book series Witchblade
Didier Baptiste, fictional character in the British television series Dream Team

See also
Baptiste (disambiguation)
 Batista (Portuguese/Spanish surname)
 Battista (Italian surname and given name) meaning "Baptist"
 Bautista (Spanish surname) meaning "Baptist"
 Baptista (Portuguese surname) meaning "Baptist"
 Baptistin (French name)

French masculine given names